The canton of Saint-Cloud is an administrative division of the Hauts-de-Seine department in northern France. Its borders were modified at the French canton reorganisation which came into effect in March 2015. Its seat is in Saint-Cloud.

It consists of the following communes:
Garches
Marnes-la-Coquette
Saint-Cloud
Vaucresson
Ville-d'Avray

References

Cantons of Hauts-de-Seine